Beklo Segno (Geʽez: በቅሎ ሰኞ) is a town in Wolayita Zone, Southern Nations, Nationalities, and Peoples' Region, Ethiopia. The town is an administrative center of Bayra Koysha district of Wolayita Zone, Ethiopia. Beklo Segno is located about 327 km away from Addis Ababa to the south on and 18 km away from Sodo to the West, the capital of Wolaita Zone. The amenities in the town are, 24 hours electricity, pure public water, banks, schools, postal service, telecommunications services and others. Beklo Segno lies between 6°55'0" N and 37°39'0" E. The town is located at an elevation of 1,932 meters above sea level.

Climate 

In the months of January and February, temperature in the town of Beklo Segno is at around 29°c and average of 366.4615 hours of sunshine in a month. Whereas July and August are the coldest months with temperature at around 15°c. April and May receive most rainfall with precipitation count of 218.97mm.

References 

Wolayita
Populated places in the Southern Nations, Nationalities, and Peoples' Region
Cities and towns in Wolayita Zone